The Travel Diaries is a podcast hosted by British-American journalist Holly Rubenstein.

Each week Rubenstein interviews a different high-profile traveller about the seven "travel chapters" of their life. "Travel chapters" include their earliest childhood travel memory, the place where they learnt the most about themselves, their hidden gem and what's at the top of their travel bucket list.

The podcast has thus far released five seasons with guests including Sir Michael Palin, Hugh Bonneville, Jo Malone, Rick Stein and Sir Ranulph Fiennes. It is frequently cited as one of the "best travel podcasts to listen to".

References 

2019 podcast debuts